Model 32 (M32), Model 1832, Model 1932 (M-1932), or variation, may refer to:

Military

Model 32 (M32)
 M32 MGL, a multiple grenade launcher
 M32 Tank Recovery Vehicle, a variant of the M4 Sherman tank
 Bofors 25 mm M/32, Swedish anti-aircraft artillery
 Czechoslovakian M32 helmet
 Consolidated Model 32 airplane; the B-24 Liberator bomber

Model 1832
aka "Model 32"/"M-32"
 Model 1832 foot artillery sword (U.S. Army)
 Model 1832 Army Foot Officers' Sword (U.S. Army), see List of individual weapons of the U.S. Armed Forces
 Model 1832 Army General & Staff Officers' Sword (U.S. Army), see List of individual weapons of the U.S. Armed Forces
 Model 1832 Army Medical Staff Officers' Sword (U.S. Army), see List of individual weapons of the U.S. Armed Forces

Model 1932 (M-1932)
aka "Model 32"/"M-32"
 BT-2 Model 1932 (USSR) a Soviet tank
 T-26 model 1932 (USSR) a Soviet tank
 45 mm anti-tank gun M1932 (19-K), a Soviet field gun
 Czechoslovakian Model 1932 Steel Helmet
 Mauser M1932 / M712 Schnellfeuer, a German select-fire pistol
 Weibel M/1932, a Danish machine gun

Non-military
 Curtiss Model 32 airplane
 Rutan Model 32 Variviggen SP airplane

See also

 
 
 
 
 
 
 
 
 
 180mm Pattern 1932 (USSR) Soviet naval artillery, see 180mm Pattern 1931-1933
 M32 (disambiguation)
 Model (disambiguation)
 32 (disambiguation)